This article concerns the Gaelic nobility of Ireland from ancient to modern times. It only partly overlaps with Chiefs of the Name because it excludes Scotland and other discussion. It is one of three groups of Irish nobility, the others being those nobles descended from the Hiberno-Normans and those granted titles of nobility in the Peerage of Ireland.

Legal status
By the time of the Treaty of Limerick, almost all Gaelic nobles had lost any semblance of real power in their (former) domains. Today, such historical titles have no special legal status in the Republic of Ireland, unlike in Northern Ireland, which has remained a part of the United Kingdom of Great Britain and Northern Ireland. The Republic of Ireland does not confer titles of nobility under its constitution.

From 1943 until 2003 some of the modern representatives of the Gaelic nobility obtained a courtesy recognition as Chiefs of the Name from the Irish government. The practice ended in 2003 following certain scandals (Terence Francis MacCarthy) and under concerns that it was unconstitutional. Disputed titles, as well as those for whom recognition is still pending, are not listed.

Nobles
Clann territories were under the rule and control of a Chief, who was elected by a system called tanistry; voted by descendants (within three generations) of the preceding Chief. The designation as Chief was also referred to as a King (Ri), Lord (Tiarna), or Captain of his countries, all of which were roughly equivalent prior to the collapse of the Gaelic order. The concept of a hereditary "title" originated with the adoption of English law, the policy of surrender and regrant and the collapse of the Gaelic order during the period from approximately 1585–1610. Because the election of a new chief would almost always be from the same family (or families) within a tribal area, each family developed a long history of ruling within an area, which gave rise to the concept of Gaelic nobility. However, ruling titles did not pass by hereditary descent; rather it was by election and bloodshed, given the absence of criminal penalties for the death of an opponent.

All below are flatha (princes) and also descendants in the male line, however distant in some cases, from at least one historical grade of Rí, a Rí túaithe (usually a local petty king), a Ruiri (overking or regional king), or a greater Rí ruirech (king of overkings, also called a provincial king or Rí cóicid). A number of rí ruirech also became Ard Rí and their surviving princely descendants remain claimants to the long vacant, so-called High Kingship. A modern Gaelic noble may be styled a self-proclaimed flaith (prince) or tiarna (lord, count/earl). See also White Rod.

The ancient Gaelic families are divided by race and sept, and by geography.

 Uí Briúin
 Uí Briúin Aí (Síl Muiredaig)
 The O'Conor Don
 The MacDermot of Moylurg, Prince of Coolavin
 Uí Briúin Bréifne
The O'Rourke of Breifne
 Uí Briúin Seóla
 The O'Flaherty

 Uí Néill
Cenél nEógain
 The O'Neill Mor, Prince of Tír Eoghain and King of Ulster
 The O'Neill of Clanaboy
 The O'Neill of the Fews
 The Seven Principal Septs Supporting The O'Neill Mor of Tír Eoghain
 The O'Hagan of Tulach Óg, Hereditary Seneschal and Brehon of Tír Eoghain
 The O'Quinn of An Chraobh, Hereditary Quartermaster of Tír Eoghain
 The O'Donnelly of Ballydonnelly, Hereditary Marshal of Tír Eoghain.
 The O'Gormley of Cenél Moen, Hereditary Steward of Horses and Chandler
 The O'Devlin of Muinterevlin, Hereditary Kern ('Ceithrenn') Sept 
 The MacMurrough of Muinterbirn and Siol Aodha of Clann Birnn, Hereditary Kern ('Ceithrenn') Sept
 The MacCawell of Cenél Fearadhaigh, Hereditary Kern ('Ceithrenn') Sept
 Other Septs of the Cenél nEógain:
 The Ó Faircheallaigh of County Cavan
 The Ó Fearghuis of Connacht
Cenél Conaill
 The O'Donnell, Prince of Tyrconnell
 The O'Dogherty of Inishowen
 Southern Uí Néill
 Clann Cholmáin Kings of Mide
 Síl nÁedo Sláine Kings of Brega
 Uí Maolmhuaidh
 Uí Maolmhuaidh Firceall 
 The O'Molloy, Prince of Firceall
 Uí Maoil Aodha
 Ó Maoil Aodha Oirthir Connachta
 Uí Maolmhaodhóg
 Ó Maolmhaodhóg Tir Connall
 Uí Maine
 The O'Kelly of Gallagh and Tycooly, Prince of Hy Many
 The Fox of Tethbae (O'Kearney)
 The Lords/Kings of Síol Anmchadha, a sub-kingdom/lordship of Uí Maine
 Laigin
Uí Cheinnselaig
The MacMorrough Kavanagh, Prince of Leinster
 The O'Morchoe
 The O'Toole of Fer Tire (in abeyance)
 Clan O’Dwyer
 Osraige
 Dál Birn
 Kings of Osraige
 Mac Giolla Phádraig (Fitzpatrick) dynasty
 Dál gCais
 The O'Brien, Prince of Thomond
 The O'Grady of Killyballyowen
 O'Halloran the O'Halloran's of County Clare
 O'Kennedy family
 McInerney family
 MacMahon family
Dál Fiatach
MacDonlevy (dynasty) (MacNulty)
 The Ó Fearghail of County Longford
 Eóganachta
 O'Keeffe family
 Eóganacht Chaisil
 The O'Callaghan of Duhallow, Lord of Clonmeen
 The McGillycuddy of the Reeks, Lord of Doonebo
 The O'Donoghue of the Glens, Prince of Glenflesk
O'Connell, hereditary castellans of Ballycarbery Castle. From this sept came Daniel O'Connell of Derrynane, "The Liberator."
 Uí Fidgenti
 The O'Donovan of Clancahill
Corcu Duibne
O'Shea of Iveragh (now represented by the descendants of Martin Archer Shee, the noted 19th-century portrait artist)
 Norse Gaelic origins
 Clann Somhairle – Crovan dynasty
 Clan Donald
 The MacDonnell of the Glens
 The King of Dublin

O'Neill claimants
Other O'Neills did not apply for recognition. The most notable of these is the Prince of the Fews, Don Carlos O'Neill, 12th Marquis of Granja. There is currently a dispute between him and the Prince of Clanaboy (above) over who is the "senior," with the matter appearing unresolvable. However most recently O'Neill of Clanaboy may have gotten the upper hand in the dispute.

The O'Neills of the Fews are a 15th-century branch of the Tyrone or Ó Néill Mór line whereas the O'Neills of Clanaboy are a High Medieval line. Hence the matter is academic, both being somewhat distant from the last sovereigns of Tyrone in Ulster (to 1607), whose plentiful descendants eventually fell into comparative obscurity. Today they are known as the McShane-O'Neills, or the anglicized version- Johnson.

O'Donnell succession
The chosen and recognised heir apparent of the Chief of the Name, Fr. Hugh O'Donel, O.F.M., is Don Hugo O'Donnell, 7th Duke of Tetuan. Other members of the family have disputed this, most notably Fr. Hugh's sister, Nuala Ní Dhomhnaill, who has even on television and radio disputed the exclusion from the succession process of potential female and female line claimants, but the head of the genealogically-senior line has been firm in his choice of his distant cousin the Duke of Tetuan.

Other Gaelic nobles

MacCarthys Mór

The most recent claimants to the royal title of MacCarthy Mór (Prince of Desmond) are two close relatives, Barry Trant MacCarthy (Mór), now elderly (born 1931), and the younger Liam Trant MacCarthy (Mór) (born 1957). They allege to be descendants of Cormac of Dunguil, younger son of Tadhg na Mainistreach Mac Carthaigh Mór, King of Desmond (died 1426), they claim to belong to the Srugrena sept, but "this is a debunked falsehood"; Sean J Murphy MA who has no proof to the contrary but insists anyway, that any claimant to a Gaelic Chiefship must first be vetted and accepted by him, and that not cooperating with Mr. Murphy means a claimant must be 'bogus'?.   Mr. Murphy has also made several attacks on the Chief Herald of Ireland since that Office denied Mr. Murphy's wish to have unfettered access to their archives.

Remaining agnates
There remain other Gaelic nobles who are not of the "senior" lines, but whose descent is recognised in Europe and a number of whom also hold Continental titles.
 The Count O'Donnell of Austria (O'Donell von Tyrconnell)
 The Count O'Rourke of Russia
 O'Nelly, The Count O'Nelly of Austria, Commander of the 72nd Bohemian Regiment

Additional
 O'Donovan family
 Dál gCais
 Baron Lisle (Lysaght)
 O'Neill dynasty
 MacShane-Johnson family
 O'Connell family
 Healy
Earl of Donoughmore

See also
 Irish kingdoms / kings
 Irish genealogy
 Tanistry
 Derbfine
 Sept
 Ranks
 Chief of the Name
 Flaith
 Tigerna
 Petty kingdom
 Incorporeal hereditament
 Hereditary title
 Substantive title

Notes

References

 Burke, Bernard and Hugh Montgomery-Massingberd, Burke's Irish Family Records. London: Burke's Peerage Ltd. 5th edition, 1976.
 and Charles Mosley, Burke's Peerage, Baronetage & Knightage. 107th edition, 2003.  
 Chambers, Anne, At Arm's Length: Aristocrats in the Republic of Ireland. New Island Books. 2nd revised edition, 2005. (selected families, Gaelic, Hiberno-Norman, and later)
 Curley, Walter J.P., Vanishing Kingdoms: The Irish Chiefs and their Families. Dublin: Lilliput Press. 2004. Foreword by Charles Lysaght.
 Debrett's  
 Ellis, Peter Berresford, Erin's Blood Royal: The Gaelic Noble Dynasties of Ireland. Palgrave. Revised edition, 2002.
 MacLysaght, Edward, Irish Families: Their Names, Arms and Origins. Irish Academic Press. 4th edition, 1998.
 Murphy, Sean J., Twilight of the Chiefs: The Mac Carthy Mór Hoax. Bethesda, Maryland: Academica Press. 2004.
 Nash, Catherine, Of Irish Descent, chapter 4. New York: Syracuse University Press. 2008.

Genealogical and historical
 Cú Choigcríche Ó Cléirigh, The O'Clery Book of Genealogies . early-mid 17th century.
 Cotter, G. de P. (ed.), "The Cotter Family of Rockforest, Co. Cork", in Journal of the Cork Historical and Archaeological Society 43 (1938): 21–31
 Cronnelly, Richard F., Irish Family History . Dublin. 1864.
 D'Alton, John, Illustrations, Historical and Genealogical, of King James's Irish Army List, 1689 2 vols. London: J.R. Smith. 2nd edition, 1861.
 Keating, Geoffrey, with David Comyn and Patrick S. Dinneen (trans.), The History of Ireland by Geoffrey Keating . 4 Vols. London: David Nutt for the Irish Texts Society. 1902–14.
 Meyer, Kuno (ed.), "The Laud Genealogies and Tribal Histories" , in Zeitschrift für Celtische Philologie 8. Halle/Saale, Max Niemeyer. 1912. Pages 291–338.
 O'Connor, Roderic, A Historical and Genealogical Memoir of the O'Connors, Kings of Connaught, and their Descendants. Dublin: McGlashan & Gill. 1861.
 Ó Corráin, Donnchadh (ed.), Genealogies from Rawlinson B 502  University College, Cork: Corpus of Electronic Texts. 1997.
 O'Donoghue, John, Historical Memoir of the O'Briens. Dublin: Hodges, Smith, & Co. 1860.
 
 O'Donovan, John and the Rt. Hon. Charles Owen O'Conor Don, The O'Conors of Connaught: An Historical Memoir . Dublin: Hodges, Figgis, and Co. 1891.
 O'Hart, John, Irish Pedigrees. Dublin. 5th edition, 1892.
 Todd, James Henthorn (ed. & tr.), Cogadh Gaedhel re Gallaibh: The War of the Gaedhil with the Gaill . London: Longmans. 1867.
 Maginn, Christopher, The Gaelic Peers, the Tudor Sovereigns, and English Multiple Monarchy, 2011.

Irish kingship and lordship
 Bhreathnach, Edel (ed.), The Kingship and Landscape of Tara. Four Courts Press for The Discovery Programme. 2005.
 Byrne, Francis J., Irish Kings and High-Kings. Four Courts Press. 2nd edition, 2001.
 Charles-Edwards, T.M., Early Christian Ireland. Cambridge. 2000.
 Dillon, Myles, "The consecration of Irish kings", in Celtica 10 (1973): 1–8.
 Dillon, Myles, The Cycles of the Kings. Oxford. 1946.
 FitzPatrick, Elizabeth, Royal Inauguration in Gaelic Ireland c. 1100–1600: A Cultural Landscape Study. Boydell Press. 2004.
 Jaski, Bart, Early Irish Kingship and Succession. Four Courts Press. 2000.
 Nicholls, K. W., Gaelic and Gaelicized Ireland in the Middle Ages. Dublin: Lilliput Press. 2nd edition, 2003.
 O'Donovan, John (ed.), and Duald Mac Firbis, The Genealogies, Tribes, and Customs of Hy-Fiachrach . Dublin: Irish Archaeological Society. 1844. pp. 425–452

Other
 Duffy, Seán (ed.), Medieval Ireland: An Encyclopedia. Routledge. 2005.
 Mac Niocaill, Gearóid, Ireland before the Vikings. Dublin: Gill and Macmillan. 1972.
 Ó Corráin, Donnchadh, Ireland before the Normans. Dublin: Gill and Macmillan. 1972.
 O'Rahilly, Thomas F., Early Irish History and Mythology. Dublin Institute for Advanced Studies. 1946.

 
Lists of peerages of Britain and Ireland
Lists of nobility
Irish nobility
Ancient Irish dynasties
European royalty